The Argentine Association Football League was the first football association of Argentina and predecessor of current Argentine Football Association. The association has a historic importance in football for having organised the first official championship outside the United Kingdom (which has the oldest football competition, the FA Cup established in 1871).

History
By the 1890s, more than 20,000 inhabitants of Argentina were British, most of them employees of railway companies. They had introduced several sports to the country, with football among them.

On March 7, 1891, the act of foundation of the "Argentine Association Football League" was signed. Board members were F.L. Wooley (president), Rovenscraf, Arcels, Mc Ewen, Hughes, Mc Intoch and Alec Lamont.

The recently formed Association set three objectives:
 The organisation of a championship played regularly
 The establishment of an institution to rule the championship created
 A code of regulations

The first Argentine football championship began on April 12, 1891, with five teams contesting the competition, they were, Old Caledonians, Buenos Aires and Rosario Railway, Buenos Aires Football Club, Belgrano Football Club, and St. Andrews.

After organising the first championship (won by Old Caledonian and St. Andrew's), the Association was dissolved. Therefore no championship would be held in 1892 until a new association with the same name (currently Argentine Football Association) was established in 1893.

See also 
 Argentine Football Association
 1891 Argentine Primera División
 Football in Argentina

Notes

References 

Football governing bodies in Argentina
Sports organizations established in 1891
Sports governing bodies in Argentina
1891 establishments in Argentina
1891 disestablishments in Argentina